United Nations Security Council Resolution 2561 was passed by a unanimous vote on 29 January 2021, which extended the mandate of the United Nations Peacekeeping Force in Cyprus (UNFICYP) until 31 July 2021.

References

External links 

 Text of the Resolution at undocs.org

 2561
 2561
2021 in Cyprus
 2561
2020s in Cypriot politics